Supraśl - is a river in east Poland in Podlaskie Voivodeship, a tributary of the Narew river (near Złotoria), with a length of 93,8 kilometres and the basin area of 1844,4 km2 

Supraśl is the source of the drinking water for Białystok.

Tributaries 
Słoja (r), Sokołda (r), Kamionka (l), Płoska (l), Pilnica (l), Czarna (r), Biała (l)

Cities and towns 
 Michałowo 
 Gródek 
 Supraśl 
 Wasilków

Rivers of Poland
Rivers of Podlaskie Voivodeship